Panchito Gomez (born November 2, 1963) is an American actor. His parents are from Ecuador and Dominican Republic.

Born in Spanish Harlem, New York, Panchito began his career at age seven with a television film: Street of the Flower Boxes. His father, actor Caesar Cordova, realized early on that the young Gomez had raw talent and charisma to have success as a performer. It was in early 1971 that The Children's Television Workshop was starting their second season, which is now the iconic children's show called Sesame Street. Panchito went on to audition amongst hundreds of children for the role of "Antonio" opposite Raúl Juliá. He got the part and became the first child actor on Sesame Street to receive screen credit.

After a two-season run on the program, Gomez went on to do numerous commercials and television shows. In the late 1970s, Gomez and his family left their home in New York to go out west to California. Once there he became one of the most working child actors on television and film. His first feature film took the young actor to Colombia, South America to star in an independent film with José Ferrer, Paco.

Filmography

See also
List of Ecuadorians
List of Puerto Ricans

References

Bibliography
 Holmstrom, John. The Moving Picture Boy: An International Encyclopaedia from 1895 to 1995. Norwich, Michael Russell, 1996, p. 344.

American male child actors
Living people
1963 births
People from East Harlem
American people of Latin American descent